Dogbo-Tota (or Dogbo) is a city located in the Kouffo Department of Benin. The commune covers an area of 475 square kilometres and as of 2013 had a population of 101,870 people.

References

Communes of Benin
Arrondissements of Benin
Populated places in the Kouffo Department